Tony Momrelle (born Anthony Momrelle on 28 April 1973) is a British R&B and jazz singer and is one of the current lead vocalists of the band Incognito.

Before his stint in Incognito, Momrelle was already a solo recording artist who released two studio albums under his name. Also, he was once a member of gospel music group Seven. In a year, he toured with D'Sound. His success in touring impressed Incognito's frontman, Bluey Maunick, and he offered him the job as the vocalist of the acid-jazz outfit.

He made his Incognito full-debut on the band's 2006 album, Bees + Things + Flowers, in which he contributed as a main vocalist.

His album, 'Keep Pushing' was released in 2015, with 'Keep Pushing (Deluxe Edition)' released in 2016.

In November 2017 he appeared alongside Seal, Lianne Carroll, Angelique Kidjo, Mica Paris, fellow Incognito band member Vanessa Haynes, Miles Mosley and Mads Mattias for the opening gala of the 25th EFG London Jazz Festival, with Guy Barker's Orchestra.

Selected appearances
Sade – Lovers Live (2002) – background vocals
Incognito – Eleven (2005) – main vocals on "I'll Get By"
Incognito – Bees + Things + Flowers (2006)
Reel People – Seven Ways to Wonder (2007) – main vocals on "Amazing", "It Will Be" and "Love Is Where You Are"
Incognito – Tales from the Beach (2008)
Sade – Soldier of Love (2010) – background vocals
Incognito – Transatlantic RPM (2010)

References

External links

Tony Momrelle Official Website
Tony Momrelle on Discogs
Incognito's Official website
Incognito's Music.com profile

1973 births
Living people
British contemporary R&B singers
British pop singers
British jazz singers
21st-century Black British male singers
English people of Guyanese descent
Incognito (band) members